The M36 tank destroyer, formally 90 mm Gun Motor Carriage, M36, was an American tank destroyer used during World War II. The M36 combined the hull of the M10 tank destroyer, which used the M4 Sherman's reliable chassis and drivetrain combined with sloped armor, and a new turret mounting the 90 mm gun M3. Conceived in 1943, the M36 first served in combat in Europe in October 1944, where it partially replaced the M10 tank destroyer. It also saw use in the Korean War, where it was able to defeat any of the Soviet tanks used in that conflict. Some were supplied to South Korea as part of the Military Assistance Program and served for years, as did re-engined examples found in Yugoslavia, which operated into the 1990s. Two remained in service with the Republic of China Army at least until 2001. 

The vehicle is also known under the unofficial nickname Jackson, but this designation appears to be a postwar appellation that was never used by the US Army.

Doctrine
U.S. combined arms doctrine on the eve of World War II held that tanks should be designed to fulfill the role of forcing a breakthrough into enemy rear areas. Separate GHQ tank battalions would support infantry in destroying fixed enemy defenses, and armored divisions would then exploit the breakthrough to rush into the enemy's vulnerable rear areas. U.S. tanks were expected to fight any hostile tanks they encountered in their attack, but the mission of defeating massed enemy armored counterattacks was assigned to a new branch, the Tank Destroyer Force. Tank destroyer units were meant to counter German blitzkrieg tactics. They were to be held as a reserve at the corps or army level, and were to move quickly to the site of any massed enemy tank breakthrough, maneuvering aggressively and using ambush tactics (charging or chasing enemy tanks was explicitly prohibited) to destroy enemy tanks. This led to a requirement for fast, well-armed vehicles. Though equipped with turrets (unlike most self-propelled anti-tank guns of the day), the typical American design was more heavily gunned, but more lightly armored, and thus more maneuverable, than a contemporary tank. The idea was to use speed and agility to bring a powerful self-propelled anti-tank gun into action against enemy tanks.

Design

With the advent of heavy German tanks such as the Panther and Tiger, the standard U.S. tank destroyer, the M10 tank destroyer, was rapidly becoming obsolete, because its main armament, the 3-inch gun M7, had difficulty defeating the thick frontal armour of these new tanks past several hundred yards.  In late summer 1942 American engineers had begun examining the potential of a new tank destroyer armed with a 90mm gun. This study resulted in a prototype vehicle, the 90 mm Gun Motor Carriage T53, which placed the 90 mm gun in an open mounting at the rear of an M4 Sherman chassis. In August 1942, it was agreed to immediately produce 500 vehicles, with 3,500 more later. The Tank Destroyer Force objected, arguing that the design of the T53 was too rushed. The 90 mm Gun Motor Carriage T53E1 proved to be even worse, and the entire contract was canceled.

In October 1942, the Ordnance Department tested mounting the experimental 90 mm gun T7 into the turret of an M10 tank destroyer. General Andrew Bruce, head of the Tank Destroyer Force, objected to the project, favoring the lighter Gun Motor Carriage M18 'Hellcat', but was ignored. Mounting the 90 mm gun was straightforward, but the gun proved too heavy for the M10's turret. A new turret was designed that incorporated power traverse and a massive counterweight to balance the gun. The first two M36 prototypes, designated 90 mm Gun Motor Carriage T71 were completed in September 1943. Initially, a request for full production was denied as 90 mm guns were already being studied for use on tanks, but Army Ground Forces approved the project in October 1943, and tests began. The ring mount on the left side of the turret for the .50 caliber Browning M2HB antiaircraft machine gun was changed to a pintle mount at the rear. It was decided that production vehicles would use the chassis of the M10A1 tank destroyer, as significant numbers of M10A1s were available, and it was determined that the M10A1 had superior automotive characteristics. After testing, an initial order for 300 vehicles was issued. The T71 was designated upon standardization on 1 June 1944 as the 90 mm Gun Motor Carriage M36.

Production

After July 1943, the appliqué armor (add on armor) bosses on the hull side of the M10A1 were deleted as the armor kits were never manufactured. This meant that some M36s had the redundant bosses, while others did not. The M36 initially retained the M10A1's "stirrup" gun rest on the rear hull; crews were unhappy about the lack of a proper travel lock for the 90 mm gun, and many improvised their own from travel locks taken from tanks. As the massive muzzle blast of the 90 mm gun obscured the crew's vision and reduced the rate of fire, a double-baffle muzzle brake was fitted to all vehicles after the first 600, beginning in early November 1944. A proper folding travel lock better-suited to the 90 mm gun was added to the rear hull at about this time. The gun itself was also modified with a better equilibrator and more powerful elevating mechanism.

As the initial contract was for 300 vehicles, General Motors' Fisher Tank Arsenal produced the last 300 M10A1 tank destroyers in January 1944 without turrets for immediate conversion to M36s. This conversion lasted from April to July 1944. The contract was later increased to 500 vehicles, as it was decided that existing M10A1s were also to be converted to M36s. The requirement was later increased to 600 vehicles on May 15, 1944. As it was found that the M10 tank destroyer had struggled against German tanks like the Panther and especially the Tiger during the Normandy campaign, the contract was increased to 1,400 vehicles on July 29, 1944. This caused problems, as only 913 of the 1,413 M10A1s that had been completed could be requisitioned from training units. Due to the lack of M10A1 hulls, it was decided to finish up the initial production run by mounting M36 turrets onto M4A3 Sherman hulls, with the necessary internal changes. The production of 187 90 mm Gun Motor Carriage M36B1 ran from October to December 1944. From June to December 1944, Massey-Harris converted 500 M10A1s into M36s. From October to December 1944, American Locomotive Company converted 413 M10A1s into M36s. The Army reduced the 1,400-vehicle objective for 1944 to 1,342 vehicles. 350 more conversions were scheduled for 1945; this number was increased to 584. A final batch of 200 M10A1s was converted by the Montreal Locomotive Works in May 1945.

The supply of M10A1s eventually ran out, so it was decided in January 1945 that M10 hulls would be used for all further conversions. American Locomotive Company converted 672 M10 hulls into the 90 mm Gun Motor Carriage M36B2 beginning in May 1945. A further batch of 52 M36B2s was completed by the Montreal Locomotive Works in May 1945.

Combat use

World War II 

The first 40 M36s did not make it overseas until September 1944, and entered combat in October 1944. The US First and Ninth Armies used M36s to reequip tank destroyer battalions attached to armored divisions. The 703rd Tank Destroyer Battalion began re-equipping on 30 September 1944. The Third US Army used them to reequip towed battalions. The 610th Tank Destroyer Battalion (Towed) began retraining on 25 September 1944. The first tank destroyer battalion to actually receive the M36 in early September, the 776th, was in transit from Italy at the time and did not use them in combat until October 1944. By the end of 1944, seven tank destroyer battalions had converted to the M36. The M36 had mostly replaced the M10 by the end of the war.

The M36 was well-liked by its crews, being one of the few armored fighting vehicles available to US forces that could destroy heavy German tanks from a distance. Corporal Anthony Pinto of the 1st Platoon, Company A, 814th Tank Destroyer Battalion knocked out a Panther at 4,200 yards (3,800 metres). Another 814th gunner, Lt Alfred Rose, scored a kill against a Panther at 4,600 yards (4200 metres), the maximum range of the telescopic sight. However, the Panther's 82 to 85mm thick glacis plate could deflect certain shots from the 90 mm gun at just 150 yards (137 metres), and the 150mm thick front armor of the Tiger II could only be penetrated in a few hard-to-hit places.

Korean War 
The M36 was used by the US Army in the Korean War. It could destroy any Soviet-made AFV deployed in that theater of operations. One postwar modification was the addition of a ball-mounted machine gun on the co-driver's side, as in many other armored fighting vehicles of the time. Due to the shortage of M26 and M46 tanks, the M36 became one of the preferred armored vehicles for MAP (Military Assistance Program) transfers.

The M36 was treated as a tank by the Republic of Korea Army despite technically being considered a self-propelled gun. The South Korean military, which faced the war without having a single tank, pushed for the creation of an armored unit and acquired the first six M36s for training in late October 1950. During the war, the South Korean Army had about 200 M36s and operated 9 tank companies. Each company was assigned to the frontline infantry division, and each tank platoon, consisting of five M36s, was attached to an infantry regiment for fire support missions. The M36 played a powerful role by direct firing at the enemy's position during the battle for high ground. Since it was operated by Koreans, command and communication between infantry and armored units were smooth, and it had a significant effect on boosting the morale.

During the Battle of White Horse during the 6–15 of October 1952, the 53rd Tank Company, assigned to the 9th Infantry Division, contributed to the victory by bombarding the side of the enemy's offensive force and suppressing heavy weapons deployed on the enemy-occupied highlands. In the Battle of Betty Hill on 15–16 July 1953, the 57th Tank Company of the 3rd Tank Battalion provided direct fire support for a platoon defending the highlands overnight, which claimed the lives of 300 communist soldiers. However, the M36 had limitations for large-scale operations due to the equipment already being retired from the U.S. military. Spare parts were always insufficient, and it was difficult to obtain fully functional vehicles for the additional construction of the armored unit. In addition, servicing the vehicle became even harder because each unit was too scattered around infantry units. Therefore, the Korean Army began operating in large numbers, forming 3 armored battalions in early 1953.

Other wars 

M36s were also exported after World War II to various countries. It was used by the French army during the First Indochina War.

The Pakistani Army received 50 M36s as military aid in the 1950s, and these served in the Indo-Pakistani War of 1965. In a surprise attack on 1 September 1965, in the Chamb−Jourian−Akhnoor sector of Jammu & Kashmir, a Pakistani armored force of two regiments, reportedly made up respectively of M36B2 tank destroyers and M47/M48 Patton medium tanks, attacked an Indian force comprising one infantry brigade and one squadron of 12 French-made AMX-13 tanks. The attack was strongly resisted and during a first phase, India claimed the destruction of six Pakistani tanks (reportedly all Pattons). In a second attack, launched at 1100 hours and contested by Indian forces reportedly claimed a further seven Pakistani tanks. While the Pakistani attackers suffered high losses, they succeeded in destroying or capturing all of the Indian tanks.

Another recipient was Yugoslavia, which received 399. The engine was later replaced with the 500 hp Soviet-made diesel engine used in T-55 main battle tanks. Yugoslavian M36s participated in the Slovenian War of Independence (1991) and Croatian War of Independence (1991–1995), but they were withdrawn immediately from service with the Croatian Armed Forces after the war. M36s were also used by Serbian forces in Bosnia and Croatia, and they were used during the Kosovo War as decoys for NATO air strikes.

The Republic of China Army acquired eight ex-French examples in 1955, having them stationed in Kinmen island group and saw combat during the Second Taiwan Strait Crisis in 1958. They were deemed more maneuverable than the bigger M48A3 and later CM11/12 MBTs, while being more powerful than M24 and M41 light tanks. As of April 2001, at least two still remained in service with troops in Lieyu Township.

Armor

American tank destroyer doctrine emphasized speed and gun power over armor. As the M10 and M36 were not purpose-built tank destroyers (they were based on tank chassis) they were not as fast as the Tank Destroyer Force wanted. General Andrew Bruce criticized the M36 due to it being too slow. The armor configuration of the M36 was identical to that of the M10A1, save the turret.

Like the M10, the M36 lacked the extra  floor plate under the driver's and assistant driver's stations that provided them additional protection from mines. Depending on the production period of its M10 parent, each side of the M36's upper hull was plain, or could be adorned with 12 appliqué armor bosses. The rear upper hull plate was used for storage of the vehicle's pioneer tools; an axe, a crowbar, a mattock handle and head, and a double-sided  sledgehammer. The track tensioning wrench was also stowed there. As a result, there were no appliqué armor bosses there regardless. The sides and rear of the upper hull featured angled extensions or covers over the upper run of track. These extensions often got in the way of fitting duckbill extended end connectors, used to reduce ground pressure on soft ground, and were often removed, along with the front fenders, by maintenance units.

The M36B1 had the hull armor configuration of the late production M4A3 Sherman tank.

A massive hollow cast counterweight was welded to the rear of the turret to balance the heavy gun.

Armament

Primary

The M36 tank destroyer used an M10A1 chassis (the M36B1 used an M4A3 Sherman chassis, while the M36B2 used an M10 chassis) mounting a large, open-topped turret mounting a 90 mm gun M3. The gunner aimed the gun using the M76F telescope. The 90 mm gun M3 was the standardized version of the experimental T7, a derivative of the 90 mm gun developed as a vehicle-mounted antitank weapon. The M36 carried 47 rounds of main gun ammunition, 11 of which were stowed in the hollow counterweight, while 36 rounds were stowed in the sponsons. For combat use, the 90mm gun M3 could fire five types of ammunition:
 M77 AP-T shot
 T33 AP-T shot
 M82 APC/HE-T shell
 M71 HE shell
 T30E16 (M304) HVAP-T shot

The M82 armor-piercing capped shot was the main round used for engaging enemy tanks. It had a large explosive filler to increase damage after penetration. The T30E16 HVAP round had difficulty with the highly sloped glacis plate of the German Panther tank, so the T33 AP shot was developed to solve this problem. The T33 shot was a normal substitute standard M77 armor piercing shot that was heat-treated to improve its hardness and fitted with a ballistic windshield to improve its drag characteristics. The T33 and T30E16 were only issued in very small numbers towards the end of World War II. The M71 high explosive shell was used for indirect fire, or engaging enemy infantry, antitank guns, light vehicles, or other soft targets.

Secondary
The M36 tank destroyer was equipped with a single .50 caliber (12.7 mm) Browning M2HB machine gun for anti-aircraft or anti-personnel use, with 1,000 rounds of ammunition. Due to the difficulty in firing the .50 caliber machine gun directly to the front, the pintle was often repositioned to the front of the turret, or a .30 caliber (7.62 mm) Browning M1919A4 machine gun mounted there. The M36B1 retained the bow machine gun of the M4A3 Sherman tank, and had 2,000 rounds of ammunition for it. The crew had their personal weapons for self-defense.

Variants

90 mm Gun Motor Carriage T71
Prototype 90 mm gun turret on 3-inch GMC M10A1 hull. Turret redesigned and standardized as M36
90 mm Gun Motor Carriage M36
 90 mm gun turret on M10A1 GMC hull. 300 built at Grand Blanc from April–July 1944 with 413 at American Loco Co Oct-Dec 1944 and 500 at Massey-Harris June-Dec 1944 by converting M10A1. Montreal Loco Works built 85 in May–June 1945.
90 mm Gun Motor Carriage M36B1
 90 mm gun turret on M4A3 Sherman hull and chassis. 187 built at Grand Blanc October-December 1944.
90 mm Gun Motor Carriage M36B2
 90 mm gun turret on M10 hull. Armored covers for turret were added to some M36B2s. 237 produced by converting M10s at American Loco in April–May 1945.

Operators

Former operators
 : Bosnian Army used them as part of the Yugoslav Wars
 : Croatian Army used many during the Croatian War of Independence.
 : Free French & French Armed Forces Post war
 : Very few captured from Iran.
 : Iranian Army M36B1 used during the Iran–Iraq War
 : Italian Army NATO about 36 M36, post-war use, from July 1953 to 1956 in the SPAT Bns of the two Armoured Divisions, from 1956 to 1961 in two Corps-level SPAT Bns (109th and 110th), and from 1961 to 1975 in some of the SPAT companies attached to the Bersaglieri Regiments.
 : Pakistani Army used US-supplied M36s against the Indians in the Indo-Pakistani Wars of 1965 & 1971.
 : Republic of China Army acquired eight M36B2 in 1955 from France, at least two still remained in service through 2001.
 : Serbian Army used some during the Yugoslav Wars
 : Slovenian Army used some during the Ten-Day War
 : First received in October 1950, around 200 vehicles served in the Army during the Korean War. Retired from active service in 1959 after being replaced by M4A3E8, and was used as fixed artillery.
 : 222 given by United States.
 : Yugoslav Army Passed onto successor states.
 : US Army Main operator.
: Philippine Army: Retired in 1960s

See also

 17pdr SP Achilles
 G-numbers
 M-numbers

References

Sources
 
 Standard Military Motor Vehicles. dated 1 Sept. 1943
 TM9-745 90mm Gun Motor Carriage M36B2, 1945 at archive.org
 TM9-748 90-mm Gun Motor Carriage M36B1, 1945 at archive.org
 TM 9-758 90-mm Gun Motor Carriage T71 (M36 GMC)
 TM 9-374 90MM Gun M3 Mounted in Combat Vehicles at archive.org

External links

 AFV Database
 OnWar
 

World War II tank destroyers of the United States
M4 Sherman tanks
Military vehicles introduced from 1940 to 1944